This is a list of published International Organization for Standardization (ISO) standards and other deliverables. For a complete and up-to-date list of all the ISO standards, see the ISO catalogue.

The standards are protected by copyright and most of them must be purchased. However, about 300 of the standards produced by ISO and IEC's Joint Technical Committee 1 (JTC 1) have been made freely and publicly available.

ISO 5000 – ISO 7999

 ISO 5006:2017 Earth-moving machinery - Operator's field of view - Test method and performance criteria
 ISO 5010:2007 Earth-moving machinery - Rubber-tyred machines - Steering requirements
 ISO 5011:2014 Inlet air cleaning equipment for internal combustion engines and compressors - Performance testing
 ISO 5053 Industrial trucks – Terminology and classification
 ISO 5053-1:2015 Part 1: Types of industrial trucks
 ISO/IEC 5055:2021 Information technology — Software measurement — Software quality measurement — Automated source code quality measures
 ISO 5122:1979 Documentation - Abstract sheets in serial publications
 ISO 5123:1984 Documentation - Headers for microfiche of monographs and serials
 ISO 5127:2017 Information and documentation - Foundation and vocabulary
 ISO 5128:1980 Acoustics – Measurement of noise inside motor vehicles
 ISO 5129:2001 Acoustics - Measurement of sound pressure levels in the interior of aircraft during flight
 ISO 5130:2007 Acoustics – Measurements of sound pressure level emitted by stationary road vehicles
 ISO 5131:2015 Tractors for agriculture and forestry – Measurement of noise at the operator's position – Survey method
 ISO 5135:1997 Acoustics – Determination of sound power levels of noise from air-terminal devices, air-terminal units, dampers and valves by measurement in a reverberation room
 ISO 5136:2003 Acoustics – Determination of sound power radiated into a duct by fans and other air-moving devices – In-duct method
 ISO 5138 Office machines - Vocabulary
 ISO 5138-1:1978 Part 1: Dictation equipment
 ISO 5138-2:1980 Part 2: Duplicators
 ISO 5138-3:1981 Part 3: Addressing machines
 ISO 5138-4:1981 Part 4: Letter opening machines
 ISO 5138-5:1981 Part 5: Letter folding machines
 ISO 5138-7:1986 Part 7: Postal franking machines
 ISO 5138-9:1984 Part 9: Typewriters
 ISO 5167 Measurement of fluid flow by means of pressure differential devices inserted in circular cross-section conduits running full
 ISO 5167-1:2003 Part 1: General principles and requirements
 ISO 5167-2:2003 Part 2: Orifice plates
 ISO 5167-3:2003 Part 3: Nozzles and Venturi nozzles
 ISO 5167-4:2003 Part 4: Venturi tubes
 ISO 5167-5:2016 Part 5: Cone meters
 ISO 5167-6:2019 Part 6: Wedge meters
 ISO 5168:2005 Measurement of fluid flow – Procedures for the evaluation of uncertainties
 ISO 5211:2017 Industrial valves - Part-turn actuator attachments
 ISO/IEC 5218:2004 Information technology — Codes for the representation of human sexes
 ISO/IEC 5230:2020 Information technology — OpenChain Specification
 ISO 5232:1998 Graphical symbols for textile machinery
 ISO 5234:2005 Textile machinery and accessories – Metallic card clothing – Definitions of dimensions, types and mounting
 ISO 5237:1978 Textile machinery and accessories — Cones for yarn winding (cross wound) — Half angle of the cone 5 degrees 57' [Withdrawn: replaced with ISO 8489-5]
 ISO 5238 Textile machinery and accessories – Packages of yarns and intermediate products
 ISO 5238-1:1982 Part 1: Terminology
 ISO 5239:1980 Textile machinery and accessories – Winding – Basic terms
 ISO 5247 Textile machinery and accessories – Weaving machines
 ISO 5247-1:2004 Part 1: Vocabulary and classification
 ISO 5247-3:1993 Part 3: Parts of the machine – Vocabulary
 ISO 5248:2003 Textile machinery and accessories – Dyeing and finishing machinery – Vocabulary for ancillary devices
 ISO 5250:2003 Textile machinery and accessories – Dyeing and finishing machinery – Terms for tentering and heat-treatment machinery
 ISO 5261:1995 Technical drawings – Simplified representation of bars and profile sections
 ISO 5284:1986 Conveyor belts – List of equivalent terms
 ISO 5288:2001 Synchronous belt drives - Vocabulary
 ISO 5323:1984 Solid wood parquet and raw parquet blocks – Vocabulary
 ISO 5329:1978 Solid wood paving blocks – Vocabulary
 ISO 5344:2004 Electrodynamic vibration generating systems – Performance characteristics
 ISO 5347 Methods for the calibration of vibration and shock pick-ups
 ISO 5347-8:1993 Part 8: Primary calibration by dual centrifuge
 ISO 5347-12:1993 Part 12: Testing of transverse shock sensitivity
 ISO 5347-13:1993 Part 13: Testing of base strain sensitivity
 ISO 5347-15:1993 Part 15: Testing of acoustic sensitivity
 ISO 5347-16:1993 Part 16: Testing of mounting torque sensitivity
 ISO 5347-17:1993 Part 17: Testing of fixed temperature sensitivity
 ISO 5347-18:1993 Part 18: Testing of transient temperature sensitivity
 ISO 5347-22:1997 Part 22: Accelerometer resonance testing – General methods
 ISO 5348:1998 Mechanical vibration and shock – Mechanical mounting of accelerometers
 ISO 5356 Anaesthetic and respiratory equipment – Conical connectors
 ISO 5356-1:2015 Part 1: Cones and sockets
 ISO 5356-2:2012 Part 2: Screw-threaded weight-bearing connectors
 ISO 5358:1992 Anaesthetic machines for use with humans
 ISO 5359:2014 Anaesthetic and respiratory equipment – Low-pressure hose assemblies for use with medical gases
 ISO 5360:2016 Anaesthetic vaporizers – Agent-specific filling systems
 ISO 5361:2016 Anaesthetic and respiratory equipment – Tracheal tubes and connectors
 ISO 5362:2006 Anaesthetic reservoir bags
 ISO 5364:2016 Anaesthetic and respiratory equipment – Oropharyngeal airways
 ISO 5366:2016 Anaesthetic and respiratory equipment – Tracheostomy tubes and connectors
 ISO 5367:2014 Anaesthetic and respiratory equipment – Breathing sets and connectors
 ISO 5391:2003 Pneumatic tools and machines - Vocabulary
 ISO 5396:1977 Hardmetal heading dies - Terminology
 ISO 5408:2009 Screw threads - Vocabulary
 ISO 5419:1982 Twist drills - Terms, definitions and types
 ISO 5420:1983 Reamers - Terms, definitions and types
 ISO 5426:1983 Information and documentation - Extension of the Latin alphabet coded character set for bibliographic information interchange
 ISO 5426-2:1996 Part 2: Latin characters used in minor European languages and obsolete typography
 ISO 5427:1984 Extension of the Cyrillic alphabet coded character set for bibliographic information interchange 
 ISO 5428:1984 Greek alphabet coded character set for bibliographic information interchange
 ISO 5436 Geometrical Product Specifications (GPS) – Surface texture: Profile method; Measurement standards
 ISO 5436-1:2000 Part 1: Material measures
 ISO 5436-2:2012 Part 2: Software measurement standards
 ISO 5445:1980 Ferrosilicon - Specification and conditions of delivery
 ISO 5446:2017 Ferromanganese - Specification and conditions of delivery
 ISO 5447:1980 Ferrosilicomanganese - Specification and conditions of delivery
 ISO 5448:1981 Ferrochromium - Specification and conditions of delivery
 ISO 5449:1980 Ferrosilicochromium - Specification and conditions of delivery
 ISO 5450:1980 Ferrotungsten - Specification and conditions of delivery
 ISO 5451:1980 Ferrovanadium - Specification and conditions of delivery
 ISO 5452:1980 Ferromolybdenum - Specification and conditions of delivery
 ISO 5453:1980 Ferroniobium - Specification and conditions of delivery
 ISO 5454:1980 Ferrotitanium - Specification and conditions of delivery
 ISO 5455:1979 Technical drawings – Scales
 ISO 5456 Technical drawings – Projection methods
 ISO 5456-1:1996 Part 1: Synopsis
 ISO 5456-2:1996 Part 2: Orthographic representations
 ISO 5456-3:1996 Part 3: Axonometric representations
 ISO 5456-4:1996 Part 4: Central projection
 ISO 5457:1999 Technical product documentation – Sizes and layout of drawing sheets
 ISO 5458:1998 Geometrical Product Specifications (GPS) – Geometrical tolerancing – Positional tolerancing
 ISO 5459:2011 Geometrical product specifications (GPS) – Geometrical tolerancing – Datums and datum systems
 ISO 5479:1997 Statistical interpretation of data - Tests for departure from the normal distribution
 ISO 5492:2008 Sensory analysis – Vocabulary
 ISO 5496:2006 Sensory analysis – Methodology – Initiation and training of assessors in the detection and recognition of odours
 ISO 5507:2002 Oilseeds, vegetable oils and fats – Nomenclature
 ISO 5526:2013 Cereals, pulses and other food grains – Nomenclature
 ISO 5527:2015 Cereals – Vocabulary
 ISO 5572:1987 Shipbuilding and marine structures - Numbering of equipment and structural elements in ships
 ISO 5576:1997 Non-destructive testing - Industrial X-ray and gamma-ray radiology - Vocabulary
 ISO 5577:2017 Non-destructive testing - Ultrasonic testing - Vocabulary
 ISO 5593:1997 Rolling bearings - Vocabulary
 ISO 5598:2008 Fluid power systems and components - Vocabulary
 ISO 5652:1984 Information processing – 9-Track, 12,7 mm (0.5 in) wide magnetic tape for information interchange – Format and recording, using group coding at 246 cpmm (6 250 cpi)
 ISO 5653:1980 Information processing – Interchangeable magnetic twelve-disk pack (200 Mbytes)
 ISO 5654 Information processing – Data interchange on 200 mm (8 in) flexible disk cartridges using two-frequency recording at 13 262 ftprad, 1,9 tpmm (48 tpi), on one side
 ISO 5654-1:1984 Part 1: Dimensional, physical and magnetic characteristics
 ISO 5654-2:1985 Part 2: Track format
 ISO 5659 Plastics - Smoke generation
 ISO 5659-1:1996 Part 1: Guidance on optical-density testing [Withdrawn: replaced by ISO 5659-2:2012]
 ISO 5659-2:2017 Part 2: Determination of optical density by a single-chamber test
 ISO/TR 5659-3:1999 Part 3: Determination of optical density by a dynamic-flow method [Withdrawn, no replacement]
 ISO 5660 Reaction-to-fire tests – Heat release, smoke production and mass loss rate
 ISO 5660-1 Heat release rate (cone calorimeter method)
 ISO 5660-2 Smoke production rate (dynamic measurement)
 ISO/TS 5660-3 Guidance on measurement
 ISO 5681:1992 Equipment for crop protection – Vocabulary
 ISO 5702:1983 Equipment for harvesting – Combine harvester component parts – Equivalent terms
 ISO 5725 Accuracy (trueness and precision) of measurement methods and results
 ISO 5725-1:1994 Part 1: General principles and definitions
 ISO 5725-2:1994 Part 2: Basic method for the determination of repeatability and reproducibility of a standard measurement method
 ISO 5725-3:1994 Part 3: Intermediate measures of the precision of a standard measurement method
 ISO 5725-4:1994 Part 4: Basic methods for the determination of the trueness of a standard measurement method
 ISO 5725-5:1998 Part 5: Alternative methods for the determination of the precision of a standard measurement method
 ISO 5725-6:1994 Part 6: Use in practice of accuracy values
 ISO 5742:2004 Pliers and nippers - Nomenclature
 ISO 5775 Bicycle tires and rims
 ISO 5776 Graphic technology - Symbols for text correction
 ISO 5800:2001 Photography – Colour negative films for still photography – Determination of ISO speed
 ISO 5806:1984 Information processing - Specification of single-hit decision tables
ISO 5807:1985 Information processing - Documentation symbols and conventions for data, program and system flowcharts, program network charts and system resources charts
 ISO 5826:2014 Resistance welding equipment – Transformers – General specifications applicable to all transformers
 ISO 5832 Implants for surgery – Metallic materials
 ISO 5832-1:2016 Part 1: Wrought stainless steel 
 ISO 5832-2:1999 Part 2: Unalloyed titanium
 ISO 5832-3:2016 Part 3: Wrought titanium 6-aluminium 4-vanadium alloy
 ISO 5832-4:2014 Part 4: Cobalt-chromium-molybdenum casting alloy
 ISO 5832-5:2005 Part 5: Wrought cobalt-chromium-tungsten-nickel alloy
 ISO 5832-6:1997 Part 6: Wrought cobalt-nickel-chromium-molybdenum alloy
 ISO 5832-7:2016 Part 7: Forgeable and cold-formed cobalt-chromium-nickel-molybdenum-iron alloy
 ISO 5832-8:1997 Part 8: Wrought cobalt-nickel-chromium-molybdenum- tungsten-iron alloy
 ISO 5832-9:2007 Part 9: Wrought high nitrogen stainless steel
 ISO 5832-11:2014 Part 11: Wrought titanium 6-aluminium 7-niobium alloy
 ISO 5832-12:2007 Part 12: Wrought cobalt-chromium-molybdenum alloy
 ISO 5832-14:2007 Part 14: Wrought titanium 15-molybdenum 5-zirconium 3-aluminium alloy
 ISO 5833:2002 Implants for surgery – Acrylic resin cements
 ISO 5834 Implants for surgery – Ultra-high-molecular-weight polyethylene
 ISO 5834-1:2005 Part 1: Powder form
 ISO 5834-2:2011 Part 2: Moulded forms
 ISO 5834-3:2005 Part 3: Accelerated ageing methods
 ISO 5834-4:2005 Part 4: Oxidation index measurement method
 ISO 5834-5:2005 Part 5: Morphology assessment method
 ISO 5835:1991 Implants for surgery – Metal bone screws with hexagonal drive connection, spherical under-surface of head, asymmetrical thread – Dimensions
 ISO 5836:1988 Implants for surgery – Metal bone plates – Holes corresponding to screws with asymmetrical thread and spherical under-surface
 ISO 5837 Implants for surgery – Intramedullary nailing systems
 ISO 5837-1:1985 Part 1: Intramedullary nails with cloverleaf or V-shaped cross-section
 ISO 5838 Implants for surgery – Metallic skeletal pins and wires
 ISO 5838-1:2013 Part 1: General requirements
 ISO 5838-2:1991 Part 2: Steinmann skeletal pins – Dimensions
 ISO 5838-3:1993 Part 3: Kirschner skeletal wires
 ISO 5840 Cardiovascular implants – Cardiac valve prostheses
 ISO 5840-1:2015 Part 1: General requirements
 ISO 5840-2:2015 Part 2: Surgically implanted heart valve substitutes
 ISO 5840-3:2013 Part 3: Heart valve substitutes implanted by transcatheter techniques
 ISO 5841 Implants for surgery – Cardiac pacemakers
 ISO 5841-2:2014 Part 2: Reporting of clinical performance of populations of pulse generators or leads
 ISO 5841-3:2013 Part 3: Low-profile connectors (IS-1) for implantable pacemakers
 ISO 5843 Aerospace - List of equivalent terms
 ISO 5843-1:1985 Part 1: Aerospace electrical equipment
 ISO 5843-2:1990 Part 2: Aerospace rivets
 ISO 5843-3:1997 Part 3: Aerospace bolts and nuts
 ISO 5843-4:1990 Part 4: Flight dynamics
 ISO 5843-5:1990 Part 5: Environmental and operating conditions for aircraft equipment
 ISO 5843-6:1985 Part 6: Standard atmosphere
 ISO 5843-8:1988 Part 8: Aircraft reliability
 ISO 5843-9:1988 Part 9: Aircraft
 ISO 5843-10:1988 Part 10: Aircraft structure
 ISO 5845 Technical drawings – Simplified representation of the assembly of parts with fasteners
 ISO 5845-1:1995 Part 1: General principles
 ISO 5845-2:1995 Part 2: Rivets for aerospace equipment
 ISO 5859:2014 Aerospace series - Graphic symbols for schematic drawings of hydraulic and pneumatic systems and components
 ISO 5878:1982 Reference atmospheres for aerospace use
 ISO 5893 Rubber and plastics test equipment – Tensile, flexural and compression types (constant rate of traverse) – Specification
 ISO 5963:1985 Documentation - Methods for examining documents, determining their subjects, and selecting indexing terms
 ISO 5964 Documentation – Guidelines for the establishment and development of multilingual thesauri
 ISO 5967:1981 Taps and thread cutting - Nomenclature of the main types and terminology
 ISO 5968:1981 Circular screwing dies - Terminology
 ISO 5971:1981 Size designation of clothes – Pantyhose
 ISO 5989:1995 Photography - Pre-packaged chemicals for the processing of silver halide based photographic materials - Vocabulary
 ISO 5993 Sodium hydroxide for industrial use—Determination of mercury content—Flameless atomic absorption spectrometric method
 ISO 6009:2016 Hypodermic needles for single use – Colour coding for identification
 ISO 6011:2003 Earth-moving machinery – Visual display of machine operation
 ISO 6050:1987 Shipbuilding - Bulbous bow and side thruster symbols
 ISO 6068:1985 Information processing – Recording characteristics of instrumentation magnetic tape (including telemetry systems) – Interchange requirements
 ISO 6070:1981 Auxiliary tables for vibration generators – Methods of describing equipment characteristics
 ISO 6078:1982 Black tea – Vocabulary
 ISO 6093:1985 Information processing - Representation of numerical values in character strings for information interchange
 ISO 6098:1984 Information processing – Self-loading cartridges for 12,7 mm (0.5 in) wide magnetic tape
 ISO 6107 Water quality—Vocabulary
 ISO 6107-1:2004 (No part title)
 ISO 6107-2:2006 (No part title)
 ISO 6107-3:1993 (No part title)
 ISO 6107-4:1993 (No part title)
 ISO 6107-5:2004 (No part title)
 ISO 6107-6:2004 (No part title)
 ISO 6107-7:2006 (No part title)
 ISO 6107-8:1993 (No part title)
 ISO 6107-9:1997 Part 9: Alphabetical list and subject index
 ISO 6152:1982 Thermometers for use with alcoholometers and alcohol hydrometers
 ISO 6160:1979 Programming languages - PL/1
 ISO 6165:2012 Earth-moving machinery – Basic types – Identification and terms and definitions
 ISO 6166:2013 Securities and related financial instruments – International securities identification numbering system (ISIN)
 ISO 6173:1982 Open-end spinning machines – Vocabulary
 ISO 6188:1986 Plastics — Poly(alkylene terephthalate) granules — Determination of water content [Withdrawn: replaced with ISO 15512]
 ISO 6194 Rotary-shaft lip-type seals incorporating elastomeric sealing elements
 ISO 6194-2:2009 Part 2: Vocabulary
 ISO 6194-5 Identification of visual imperfections
 ISO 6196 Micrographics - Vocabulary
 ISO 6196-1:1993 Part 1: General terms
 ISO 6196-2:1993 Part 2: Image positions and methods of recording
 ISO 6196-3:1997 Part 3: Film processing
 ISO 6196-4:1998 Part 4: Materials and packaging
 ISO 6196-5:1987 Part 5: Quality of images, legibility, inspection
 ISO 6196-6:1992 Part 6: Equipment
 ISO 6196-7:1992 Part 7: Computer micrographics
 ISO 6196-8:1998 Part 8: Use
 ISO 6196-10:1999 Part 10: Index
 ISO 6206:1979 Chemical products for industrial use – Sampling – Vocabulary
 ISO 6217:1982 Shipbuilding – Inland navigation – Pilot craft – Identification painting and inscriptions
 ISO 6222:1999 Water quality – Enumeration of culturable micro-organisms – Colony count by inoculation in a nutrient agar culture medium
 ISO 6284:1996 Construction drawings – Indication of limit deviations
 ISO 6289:2003 Skis – Vocabulary
 ISO 6336 Calculation of load capacity of spur and helical gears
 ISO 6344 Coated abrasives – Grain size analysis
 ISO 6345:1990 Shipbuilding and marine structures – Windows and side scuttles – Vocabulary
 ISO 6346 Freight containers – Coding, identification and marking
 ISO 6348:1980 Textiles – Determination of mass – Vocabulary
 ISO 6352:1985 Ferronickel - Determination of nickel content - Dimethylglyoxime gravimetric method
 ISO 6354:1982 Adhesives – Vocabulary [Withdrawn: replaced with ISO 472]
 ISO 6355:1988 Textile glass – Vocabulary [Withdrawn: replaced with ISO 472]
 ISO 6357:1985 Documentation – Spine titles on books and other publications
 ISO 6372:2017 Nickel and nickel alloys – Terms and definitions
 ISO 6385:2016 Ergonomics principles in the design of work systems
 ISO 6393:2008 Earth-moving machinery – Determination of sound power level – Stationary test conditions
 ISO 6394:2008 Earth-moving machinery – Determination of emission sound pressure level at operator's position – Stationary test conditions
 ISO 6395:2008 Earth-moving machinery – Determination of sound power level – Dynamic test conditions
 ISO 6396:2008 Earth-moving machinery – Determination of emission sound pressure level at operator's position – Dynamic test conditions
 ISO 6405 Earth-moving machinery - Symbols for operator controls and other displays
 ISO 6405-1:2017 Part 1: Common symbols
 ISO 6405-2:2017 Part 2: Symbols for specific machines, equipment and accessories
 ISO 6410 Technical drawings – Screw threads and threaded parts
 ISO 6410-1:1993 Part 1: General conventions
 ISO 6410-2:1993 Part 2: Screw thread inserts
 ISO 6410-3:1993 Part 3: Simplified representation
 ISO 6411:1982 Technical drawings – Simplified representation of centre holes
 ISO 6412 Technical drawings – Simplified representation of pipelines
 ISO 6412-1:2017 Part 1: General rules and orthogonal representation
 ISO 6412-2:2017 Part 2: Isometric projection
 ISO 6412-3:2017 Part 3: Terminal features of ventilation and drainage systems
 ISO 6413:1988 Technical drawings – Representation of splines and serrations
 ISO 6414:1982 Technical drawings for glassware
 ISO 6416:2017 Hydrometry – Measurement of discharge by the ultrasonic transit time (time of flight) method
 ISO 6420:2016 Hydrometry – Position fixing equipment for hydrometric boats
 ISO 6421:2012 Hydrometry – Methods for assessment of reservoir sedimentation
 ISO 6422 Layout key for trade documents
 ISO 6422-1:2010 Part 1: Paper-based documents
 ISO 6425:1996 Divers' watches
 ISO 6426 Horological vocabulary
 ISO 6426-1:1982 Part 1: Technical and scientific definitions
 ISO 6426-2:2002 Part 2: Technical and commercial definitions
 ISO 6428:1982 Technical drawings – Requirements for microcopying 
 ISO/IEC 6429:1992 Information technology – Control functions for coded character sets
 ISO 6433:2012 Technical product documentation – Part references
 ISO 6438:1983 Documentation – African coded character set for bibliographic information interchange
 ISO 6461 Water quality – Detection and enumeration of the spores of sulfite-reducing anaerobes (clostridia)
 ISO 6461-1:1986 Part 1: Method by enrichment in a liquid medium
 ISO 6461-2:1986 Part 2: Method by membrane filtration
 ISO 6467:1980 Ferrovanadium - Determination of vanadium content - Potentiometric method
 ISO 6472:2017 Rubber compounding ingredients – Abbreviated terms
 ISO 6474 Implants for surgery – Ceramic materials
 ISO 6474-1:2010 Part 1: Ceramic materials based on high purity alumina
 ISO 6474-2:2012 Part 2: Composite materials based on a high-purity alumina matrix with zirconia reinforcement
 ISO 6475:1989 Implants for surgery – Metal bone screws with asymmetrical thread and spherical under-surface – Mechanical requirements and test methods
 ISO 6501:1988 Ferronickel - Specification and delivery requirements
 ISO 6512:1982 Building construction — Modular coordination — Storey heights and room heights [Withdrawn: replaced with ISO 21723]
 ISO 6513:1982 Building construction — Modular coordination — Series of preferred multimodular sizes for horizontal dimensions [Withdrawn: replaced with ISO 21723]
 ISO 6514:1982 Building construction — Modular coordination — Sub-modular increments [Withdrawn: replaced with ISO 21723]
 ISO 6518 Road vehicles – Ignition systems
 ISO 6518-1:2002 Part 1: Vocabulary
 ISO/IEC 6522:1992 Information technology - Programming languages - PL/1 general purpose subset
 ISO/IEC 6523 Information technology – Structure for the identification of organizations and organization parts
 ISO 6531:2017 Machinery for forestry – Portable chain-saws – Vocabulary
 ISO 6552:1980 Automatic steam traps - Definition of technical terms
 ISO 6579 Microbiology of the food chain – Horizontal method for the detection, enumeration and serotyping of Salmonella
 ISO 6579-1:2017 Part 1: Detection of Salmonella spp.
 ISO/TS 6579-2:2012 Part 2: Enumeration by a miniaturized most probable number technique
 ISO/TR 6579-3:2014 Part 3: Guidelines for serotyping of Salmonella spp.
 ISO 6586:1980 Data processing - Implementation of the ISO 7- bit and 8- bit coded character sets on punched cards
 ISO 6590 Packaging – Sacks – Vocabulary and types
 ISO 6590-1:1983 Part 1: Paper sacks
 ISO 6590-2:1986 Part 2: Sacks made from thermoplastic flexible film
 ISO 6594 Cast iron drainage pipes and fittings – Spigot series
 ISO 6596 Information processing – Data interchange on 130 mm (5.25 in) flexible disk cartridges using two-frequency recording at 7 958 ftprad, 1.9 tpmm (48 tpi), on one side
 ISO 6596-1:1985 Part 1: Dimensional, physical and magnetic characteristics
 ISO 6596-2:1985 Part 2: Track format
 ISO 6611:2004 Milk and milk products – Enumeration of colony-forming units of yeasts and/or moulds – Colony-count technique at 25 degrees C
 ISO 6621 Internal combustion engines – Piston rings
 ISO 6621-1:2007 Part 1: Vocabulary
 ISO 6630:1986 Documentation - Bibliographic control characters
 ISO 6689 Equipment for harvesting – Combines and functional components
 ISO 6689-1:1997 Part 1: Vocabulary
 ISO 6706:1981 Plastics laboratory ware – Graduated measuring cylinders
 ISO 6707 Buildings and civil engineering works – Vocabulary
 ISO 6707-1:2014 Part 1: General terms
 ISO 6707-2:2014 Part 2: Contract terms
 ISO 6707-3:2017 Part 3: Sustainability terms
 ISO 6709:2008 Standard representation of geographic point location by coordinates
 ISO 6710:2017 Single-use containers for human venous blood specimen collection
 ISO 6725:1981 Road vehicles – Dimensions of two-wheeled mopeds and motorcycles – Terms and definitions
 ISO 6726:1988 Mopeds and motorcycles with two wheels – Masses – Vocabulary
 ISO 6727:2012 Road vehicles - Motorcycles - Symbols for controls, indicators and tell-tales
 ISO 6730:2005 Milk – Enumeration of colony-forming units of psychrotrophic microorganisms – Colony-count technique at 6,5 degrees C
 ISO 6747:2013 Earth-moving machinery – Dozers – Terminology and commercial specifications
 ISO 6780:2003 Flat pallets for intercontinental materials handling — Principal dimensions and tolerances, reviewed and confirmed 2014 
 ISO 6798:1995 Reciprocating internal combustion engines – Measurement of emitted airborne noise – Engineering method and survey method
 ISO 6811:1998 Spherical plain bearings - Vocabulary
 ISO 6813:1998 Road vehicles – Collision classification – Terminology
 ISO 6814:2009 Machinery for forestry – Mobile and self-propelled machinery – Terms, definitions and classification
 ISO 6861:1996 Information and documentation - Glagolitic alphabet coded character set for bibliographic information interchange
 ISO 6862:1996 Information and documentation - Mathematical coded character set for bibliographic information interchange
 ISO 6871 Dental base metal casting alloys
 ISO 6871-1:1994 Part 1: Cobalt-based alloys [Withdrawn: replaced with ISO 22674]
 ISO 6871-2:1994 Part 2: Nickel-based alloys [Withdrawn: replaced with ISO 22674]
 ISO 6883:2017 Animal and vegetable fats and oils - Determination of conventional mass per volume (litre weight in air)
 ISO 6887 Microbiology of the food chain - Preparation of test samples, initial suspension and decimal dilutions for microbiological examination
 ISO 6887-1:2017 Part 1: General rules for the preparation of the initial suspension and decimal dilutions
 ISO 6887-2:2017 Part 2: Specific rules for the preparation of meat and meat products
 ISO 6887-3:2017 Part 3: Specific rules for the preparation of fish and fishery products
 ISO 6887-4:2017 Part 4: Specific rules for the preparation of miscellaneous products
 ISO 6887-5:2010 Part 5: Specific rules for the preparation of milk and milk products
 ISO 6887-6:2013 Part 6: Specific rules for the preparation of samples taken at the primary production stage
 ISO 6888 Microbiology of food and animal feeding stuffs – Horizontal method for the enumeration of coagulase-positive staphylococci (Staphylococcus aureus and other species)
 ISO 6888-1:1999 Part 1: Technique using Baird-Parker agar medium
 ISO 6888-2:1999 Part 2: Technique using rabbit plasma fibrinogen agar medium
 ISO 6888-3:2003 Part 3: Detection and MPN technique for low numbers
 ISO 6892 Metallic materials – Tensile testing
 ISO 6892-1 Method of test at room temperature
 ISO 6892-2 Method of test at elevated temperature
 ISO 6892-3 Method of test at low temperature
 ISO 6892-4 Method of test in liquid helium
 ISO 6926:2016 Acoustics – Requirements for the performance and calibration of reference sound sources used for the determination of sound power levels
 ISO 6927:2012 Buildings and civil engineering works – Sealants – Vocabulary
 ISO 6929:2013 Steel products – Vocabulary
 ISO 6936:1988 Information processing - Conversion between the two coded character sets of ISO 646 and ISO 6937-2 and the CCITT international telegraph alphabet No. 2 (ITA 2)
 ISO/IEC 6937:2001 Information technology - Coded graphic character set for text communication - Latin alphabet
 ISO 6938:2012 Textiles – Natural fibres – Generic names and definitions
 ISO 6946 Building components and building elements – Thermal resistance and thermal transmittance – Calculation method
 ISO 6951:1986 Information processing - Processor system bus interface (Eurobus A)
 ISO 6974-1:2012 Natural  gas  — Determination  of  composition and  associated  uncertainty by  gas  chromatography Part  1:  General  guidelines  and calculation  of  composition
 ISO 6974-2:2012 Natural gas — Determination of composition and associated uncertainty by gas chromatography Part 2: Uncertainty calculations
 ISO 6974-3:2001 Natural gas — Determination of composition with defined uncertainty by gas chromatography — Part  3:  Determination  of  hydrogen, helium, oxygen, nitrogen,  carbon dioxide and hydrocarbons up to C8 using two  packed columns
 ISO 6974-5:2001 Natural gas — Determination of composition with defined uncertainty by gas chromatography — Part 5: Determination of  nitrogen, carbon  dioxide and C1 to  C5 and C6+ hydrocarbons for a  laboratory  and on-line process application using  three columns
 ISO 6974-6: 2008 Natural gas — Determination of composition with defined uncertainty by gas chromatography — Part  6:  Determination  of  hydrogen, helium, oxygen, nitrogen,  carbon dioxide and C1 to C8 hydrocarbons using three capillary  columns
 ISO 6980 Nuclear energy - Reference beta-particle radiation
 ISO 6980-1:2006 Part 1: Methods of production
 ISO 6980-2:2004 Part 2: Calibration fundamentals related to basic quantities characterizing the radiation field
 ISO 6980-3:2006 Part 3: Calibration of area and personal dosemeters and the determination of their response as a function of beta radiation energy and angle of incidence
 ISO 7000:2014 Graphical symbols for use on equipment - Registered symbols
 ISO 7001:2007 Graphical symbols – Public information symbols
 ISO 7002 Agricultural food products – Layout for a standard method of sampling from a lot
 ISO 7010:2011 Graphical symbols - Safety colours and safety signs - Registered safety signs
 ISO 7029:2017 Acoustics - Statistical distribution of hearing thresholds related to age and gender
 ISO 7056:1981 Plastics laboratory ware – Beakers
 ISO/IEC 7064:2003 Information technology - Security techniques - Check character systems
 ISO 7065 Information processing – Data interchange on 200 mm (8 in) flexible disk cartridges using modified frequency modulation recording at 13 262 ftprad, 1,9 tpmm (48 tpi), on both sides
 ISO 7065-1:1985 Part 1: Dimensional, physical and magnetic characteristics
 ISO 7065-2:1985 Part 2: Track format
 ISO 7066 Assessment of uncertainty in the calibration and use of flow measurement devices
 ISO 7066-2:1988 Part 2: Non-linear calibration relationships
 ISO 7078:1985 Building construction – Procedures for setting out, measurement and surveying – Vocabulary and guidance notes
 ISO 7083:1983 Technical drawings – Symbols for geometrical tolerancing – Proportions and dimensions
 ISO 7087:1984 Ferroalloys - Experimental methods for the evaluation of the quality variation and methods for checking the precision of sampling
 ISO 7088:1981 Fish-meal – Vocabulary
 ISO 7089:2000 Plain washers — Normal series — Product grade A
 ISO 7090:2000 Plain washers, chamfered — Normal series — Product grade A
 ISO 7091:2000 Plain washers — Normal series — Product grade C
 ISO 7092:2000 Plain washers — Small series — Product grade A
 ISO 7093:2000 Plain washers — Large series
 ISO 7098:2015 Information and documentation – Romanization of Chinese
 ISO 7112:2017 Machinery for forestry – Portable brush-cutters and grass-trimmers – Vocabulary
 ISO 7130:2013 Earth-moving machinery – Operator training – Content and methods
 ISO 7131:2009 Earth-moving machinery – Loaders – Terminology and commercial specifications
 ISO 7132:2003 Earth-moving machinery – Dumpers – Terminology and commercial specifications 
 ISO 7133:2013 Earth-moving machinery – Scrapers – Terminology and commercial specifications
 ISO 7134:2013 Earth-moving machinery – Graders – Terminology and commercial specifications
 ISO 7135:2009 Earth-moving machinery – Hydraulic excavators – Terminology and commercial specifications
 ISO 7136:2006 Earth-moving machinery – Pipelayers – Terminology and commercial specifications
 ISO 7137:1995 Aircraft - Environmental conditions and test procedures for airborne equipment
 ISO 7144:1986 Documentation – Presentation of theses and similar documents
 ISO 7151:1988 Surgical instruments – Non-cutting, articulated instruments – General requirements and test methods
 ISO 7152:1997 Camping tents and caravan awnings – Vocabulary and list of equivalent terms
 ISO 7153 Surgical instruments – Materials
 ISO 7153-1:2016 Part 1: Metals
 ISO 7154:1983 Documentation - Bibliographic filing principles
 ISO 7176 Wheelchairs
 ISO 7176-21:2009 Part 21: Requirements and test methods for electromagnetic compatibility of electrically powered wheelchairs and scooters, and battery chargers
 ISO 7176-26:2007 Part 26: Vocabulary
 ISO 7185:1990 Information technology - Programming languages - Pascal
 ISO 7194:2008 Measurement of fluid flow in closed conduits – Velocity-area methods of flow measurement in swirling or asymmetric flow conditions in circular ducts by means of current-meters or Pitot static tubes
 ISO 7196:1995 Acoustics – Frequency-weighting characteristic for infrasound measurements
 ISO 7197:2006 Neurosurgical implants – Sterile, single-use hydrocephalus shunts and components
 ISO 7198:2016 Cardiovascular implants and extracorporeal systems – Vascular prostheses – Tubular vascular grafts and vascular patches
 ISO 7199:2016 Cardiovascular implants and artificial organs – Blood-gas exchangers (oxygenators)
 ISO 7200:2004 Technical product documentation – Data fields in title blocks and document headers
 ISO 7206 Implants for surgery – Partial and total hip joint prostheses
 ISO 7206-1:2008 Part 1: Classification and designation of dimensions
 ISO 7206-2:2011 Part 2: Articulating surfaces made of metallic, ceramic and plastics materials
 ISO 7206-4:2010 Part 4: Determination of endurance properties and performance of stemmed femoral components
 ISO 7206-6:2013 Part 6: Endurance properties testing and performance requirements of neck region of stemmed femoral components
 ISO 7206-10:2003 Part 10: Determination of resistance to static load of modular femoral heads
 ISO 7206-12:2016 Part 12: Deformation test method for acetabular shells
 ISO 7206-13:2016 Part 13: Determination of resistance to torque of head fixation of stemmed femoral components
 ISO 7207 Implants for surgery – Components for partial and total knee joint prostheses
 ISO 7207-1:2007 Part 1: Classification, definitions and designation of dimensions
 ISO 7207-2:2011 Part 2: Articulating surfaces made of metal, ceramic and plastics materials
 ISO 7216:2015 Agricultural and forestry tractors – Measurement of noise emitted when in motion
 ISO 7218:2007 Microbiology of food and animal feeding stuffs – General requirements and guidance for microbiological examinations
 ISO 7220:1996 Information and documentation - Presentation of catalogues of standards
 ISO 7237:1993 Caravans – Masses and dimensions – Vocabulary
 ISO 7240 Fire detection and alarm systems
 ISO 7251:2005 Microbiology of food and animal feeding stuffs – Horizontal method for the detection and enumeration of presumptive Escherichia coli – Most probable number technique
 ISO 7255:1985 Shipbuilding – Active control units of ships – Vocabulary
 ISO 7275:1985 Documentation – Presentation of title information of series
 ISO 7287:2002 Graphical symbols for thermal cutting equipment
 ISO 7294:1983 Saw teeth for woodworking saws – Profile shape – Terminology and designation
 ISO 7296 Cranes - Graphic symbols
 ISO 7296-1:1991 Part 1: General
 ISO 7296-2:1996 Part 2: Mobile cranes
 ISO 7296-3:2006 Part 3: Tower cranes
 ISO 7297:1985 Information processing – Magnetic disk for data storage devices – 96 000 flux transitions per track, 200 mm (7.9 in) outer diameter, 63,5 mm (2.5 in) inner diameter
 ISO 7298:1985 Information processing – Magnetic disk for data storage devices – 158 000 flux transitions per track, 210 mm (8.3 in) outer diameter, 100 mm (3.9 in) inner diameter
 ISO 7345:1987 Thermal insulation – Physical quantities and definitions
 ISO 7347:1987 Ferroalloys - Experimental methods for checking the bias of sampling and sample preparation
 ISO 7348:1992 Glass containers – Manufacture – Vocabulary
 ISO/IEC 7350:1991 Information technology - Registration of repertoires of graphic characters from ISO/IEC 10367
 ISO 7369:2004 Pipework - Metal hoses and hose assemblies - Vocabulary
 ISO 7372:2005 Trade data interchange - Trade data elements directory
 ISO 7373:1987 Ferroalloys - Experimental methods for checking the precision of sample division
 ISO 7376:2009 Anaesthetic and respiratory equipment – Laryngoscopes for tracheal intubation
 ISO 7380 Button Head Screws
 ISO 7380-1:2011 Part 1: Hexagon socket button head screws
 ISO 7380-2:2011 Part 2: Hexagon socket button head screws with collar
 ISO 7396 Medical gas pipeline systems
 ISO 7396-1:2016 Part 1: Pipeline systems for compressed medical gases and vacuum
 ISO 7396-2:2007 Part 2: Anaesthetic gas scavenging disposal systems
 ISO 7404 Methods for the petrographic analysis of coals
 ISO 7404-1:2016 Part 1: Vocabulary
 ISO 7437:1990 Technical drawings – Construction drawings – General rules for execution of production drawings for prefabricated structural components
 ISO 7462:1985 Shipbuilding - Principal ship dimensions - Terminology and definitions for computer applications
 ISO 7478:1987 Information processing systems – Data communication – Multilink procedures
 ISO 7479:1982 Textile machinery and accessories — Metal reeds with plastic baulk [Withdrawn: replaced with ISO 366-4]
 ISO/IEC 7480:1991 Information technology – Telecommunications and information exchange between systems – Start-stop transmission signal quality at DTE/DCE interfaces
 ISO 7482 Raw goat skins
 ISO 7482-1:1998 Part 1: Descriptions of defects
 ISO/IEC 7487 Information technology – Data interchange on 130 mm (5,25 in) flexible disk cartridges using modified frequency modulation recording at 7 958 ftprad, 1,9 tpmm (48 tpi), on both sides – ISO type 202
 ISO/IEC 7487-1:1993 Part 1: Dimensional, physical and magnetic characteristics
 ISO 7487-2:1985 Part 2: Track format A
 ISO 7487-3:1986 Part 3: Track format B
 ISO 7489:1986 Dental glass polyalkenoate cements [Withdrawn: replaced with ISO 9917]
 ISO/IEC 7498 Information technology — Open Systems Interconnection — Basic Reference Model
 ISO/IEC 7498-1:1994 The Basic Model
 ISO 7498-2:1989 Part 2: Security Architecture
 ISO/IEC 7498-3:1997 Naming and addressing
 ISO/IEC 7498-4:1989 Part 4: Management framework
 ISO/IEC 7501 Identification cards – Machine readable travel documents
 ISO/IEC 7501-1:2008 Part 1: Machine readable passport
 ISO/IEC 7501-2:1997 Part 2: Machine readable visa
 ISO/IEC 7501-3:2005 Part 3: Machine readable official travel documents
 ISO 7504:2015 Gas analysis – Vocabulary
 ISO 7518:1983 Technical drawings – Construction drawings – Simplified representation of demolition and rebuilding
 ISO 7519:1991 Technical drawings – Construction drawings – General principles of presentation for general arrangement and assembly drawings
 ISO 7520:1985 Ferronickel - Determination of cobalt content - Flame atomic absorption spectrometric method
 ISO 7524:1985 Nickel, ferronickel and nickel alloys - Determination of carbon content - Infra-red absorption method after induction furnace combustion
 ISO 7526:1985 Nickel, ferronickel and nickel alloys - Determination of sulfur content - Infra-red absorption method after induction furnace combustion
 ISO 7527:1985 Nickel, ferronickel and nickel alloys - Determination of sulfur content - Iodimetric titration method after induction furnace combustion
 ISO 7550:1985 Laboratory glassware – Disposable micropipettes
 ISO 7563:1998 Fresh fruits and vegetables – Vocabulary
 ISO 7568:1986 Woodworking machines – Thickness planing machines with rotary cutterblock for one-side dressing – Nomenclature and acceptance conditions
 ISO 7569:1986 Woodworking machines – Planing machines for two-, three- or four-side dressing – Nomenclature and acceptance conditions
 ISO 7570:1986 Woodworking machines – Surface planing and thicknessing machines – Nomenclature and acceptance conditions
 ISO 7571:1986 Woodworking machines – Surface planing machines with cutterblock for one-side dressing – Nomenclature and acceptance conditions
 ISO 7573:2008 Technical product documentation – Parts lists
 ISO 7574 Acoustics – Statistical methods for determining and verifying stated noise emission values of machinery and equipment
 ISO 7574-1:1985 Part 1: General considerations and definitions
 ISO 7574-2:1985 Part 2: Methods for stated values for individual machines
 ISO 7574-3:1985 Part 3: Simple (transition) method for stated values for batches of machines
 ISO 7574-4:1985 Part 4: Methods for stated values for batches of machines
 ISO 7583:2013 Anodizing of aluminium and its alloys - Terms and definitions
 ISO 7626 Mechanical vibration and shock – Experimental determination of mechanical mobility
 ISO 7626-1:2011 Part 1: Basic terms and definitions, and transducer specifications
 ISO 7626-2:2015 Part 2: Measurements using single-point translation excitation with an attached vibration exciter
 ISO 7626-5:1994 Part 5: Measurements using impact excitation with an exciter which is not attached to the structure
 ISO 7637 Road vehicles – Electrical disturbances from conduction and coupling
 ISO 7637-1:2015 Part 1: Definitions and general considerations
 ISO 7639:1985 Road vehicles - Diagnostic systems - Graphical symbols
 ISO 7665:1983 Information processing – File structure and labelling of flexible disk cartridges for information interchange
 ISO 7692:1983 Ferrotitanium - Determination of titanium content - Titrimetric method
 ISO 7693:1984 Ferrotungsten - Determination of tungsten content - Cinchonine gravimetric method
 ISO 7704:1985 Water quality – Evaluation of membrane filters used for microbiological analyses
 ISO 7711 Dentistry – Diamond rotary instruments
 ISO 7711-3:2004 Part 3: Grit sizes, designation and colour code
 ISO 7712:1983 Laboratory glassware – Disposable Pasteur pipettes
 ISO 7736 Road vehicles – Car radio for front installation – Installation space including connections
 ISO 7740:1985 Instruments for surgery – Scalpels with detachable blades – Fitting dimensions
 ISO 7741:1986 Instruments for surgery – Scissors and shears – General requirements and test methods 
 ISO/IEC 7776:1995 Information technology – Telecommunications and information exchange between systems – High-level data link control procedures – Description of the X.25 LAPB-compatible DTE data link procedures
 ISO 7779:2010 Acoustics - Measurement of airborne noise emitted by information technology and telecommunications equipment
 ISO/IEC 7810 Identification cards – Physical characteristics
 ISO/IEC 7811 Identification cards – Recording technique
 ISO/IEC 7812 Identification cards – Identification of issuers
 ISO/IEC 7813:2006 Information technology – Identification cards – Financial transaction cards
 ISO/IEC 7816 Identification cards – Integrated circuit cards
 ISO 7830:1983 Photography — Safety photographic films other than motion picture films — Material specifications Withdrawn: replaced with ISO 543, later ISO 18906
 ISO 7839:2005 Textile machinery and accessories – Knitting machines – Vocabulary and classification
 ISO/TS 7849 Acoustics – Determination of airborne sound power levels emitted by machinery using vibration measurement
 ISO/TS 7849-1:2009 Part 1: Survey method using a fixed radiation factor
 ISO/TS 7849-2:2009 Part 2: Engineering method including determination of the adequate radiation factor
 ISO 7863:1984 Height setting micrometers and riser blocks
 ISO 7864:2016 Sterile hypodermic needles for single use – Requirements and test methods
 ISO 7870 Control charts
 ISO 7870-1:2014 Part 1: General guidelines
 ISO 7870-2:2013 Part 2: Shewhart control charts
 ISO 7870-3:2012 Part 3: Acceptance control charts
 ISO 7870-4:2011 Part 4: Cumulative sum charts
 ISO 7870-5:2014 Part 5: Specialized control charts
 ISO 7870-6:2016 Part 6: EWMA control charts
 ISO 7870-8:2017 Part 8: Charting techniques for short runs and small mixed batches
 ISO 7876 Fuel injection equipment – Vocabulary
 ISO 7876-1:1990 Part 1: Fuel injection pumps
 ISO 7876-2:1991 Part 2: Fuel injectors
 ISO 7876-3:1993 Part 3: Unit injectors
 ISO 7876-4:2004 Part 4: High-pressure pipes and end-connections
 ISO 7876-5:2004 Part 5: Common rail fuel injection system
 ISO 7885:2010 Dentistry – Sterile injection needles for single use
 ISO 7886 Sterile hypodermic syringes for single use
 ISO 7886-1:2017 Part 1: Syringes for manual use
 ISO 7886-2:1996 Part 2: Syringes for use with power-driven syringe pumps
 ISO 7886-3:2005 Part 3: Auto-disable syringes for fixed-dose immunization
 ISO 7886-4:2006 Part 4: Syringes with re-use prevention feature
 ISO 7889:2003 Yogurt – Enumeration of characteristic microorganisms – Colony-count technique at 37 degrees C
 ISO 7899 Water quality – Detection and enumeration of intestinal enterococci
 ISO 7899-1:1998 Part 1: Miniaturized method (Most Probable Number) for surface and waste water
 ISO 7899-2:2000 Part 2: Membrane filtration method
 ISO 7919 Mechanical vibration – Evaluation of machine vibration by measurements on rotating shafts
 ISO 7919-3:2009 Part 3: Coupled industrial machines
 ISO 7919-4:2009 Part 4: Gas turbine sets with fluid-film bearings
 ISO 7919-5:2005 Part 5: Machine sets in hydraulic power generating and pumping plants
 ISO 7929:1985 Information processing – Magnetic disk for data storage devices – 83 000 flux transitions per track, 130 mm (5.12 in) outer diameter, 40 mm (1.57 in) inner diameter
 ISO 7932:2004 Microbiology of food and animal feeding stuffs – Horizontal method for the enumeration of presumptive Bacillus cereus – Colony-count technique at 30 degrees C
 ISO 7937:2004 Microbiology of food and animal feeding stuffs – Horizontal method for the enumeration of Clostridium perfringens – Colony-count technique
 ISO/IEC 7942 Information technology – Computer graphics and image processing – Graphical Kernel System (GKS)
 ISO 7944:1998 Optics and optical instruments - Reference wavelengths
 ISO 7945:1985 Woodworking machines – Single spindle boring machines – Nomenclature and acceptance conditions
 ISO 7946:1985 Woodworking machines – Slot mortising machines – Nomenclature and acceptance conditions
 ISO 7947:1985 Woodworking machines – Two-, three- and four-side moulding machines – Nomenclature and acceptance conditions
 ISO 7948:1987 Woodworking machines – Routing machines – Nomenclature and acceptance conditions
 ISO 7949:1985 Woodworking machines – Veneer pack edge shears – Nomenclature and acceptance conditions
 ISO 7950:1985 Woodworking machines – Single chain mortising machines – Nomenclature and acceptance conditions
 ISO 7957:1987 Woodworking machines – Radial circular saws – Nomenclature and acceptance conditions
 ISO 7958:1987 Woodworking machines – Single blade stroke circular sawing machines for lengthwise cutting of solid woods and panels – Nomenclature and acceptance conditions
 ISO 7959:1987 Woodworking machines – Double edging precision circular sawing machines – Nomenclature and acceptance conditions
 ISO 7960:1995 Airborne noise emitted by machine tools – Operating conditions for woodworking machines
 ISO 7967 Reciprocating internal combustion engines - Vocabulary of components and systems
 ISO 7967-1:2005 Part 1: Structure and external covers
 ISO 7967-2:2010 Part 2: Main running gear
 ISO 7967-3:2010 Part 3: Valves, camshaft drives and actuating mechanisms
 ISO 7967-4:2005 Part 4: Pressure charging and air/exhaust gas ducting systems
 ISO 7967-5:2010 Part 5: Cooling systems
 ISO 7967-6:2005 Part 6: Lubricating systems
 ISO 7967-7:2005 Part 7: Governing systems
 ISO 7967-8:2005 Part 8: Starting systems
 ISO 7967-9:2010 Part 9: Control and monitoring systems
 ISO 7967-10:2014 Part 10: Ignition systems
 ISO 7967-11:2014 Part 11: Fuel systems
 ISO 7967-12:2014 Part 12: Exhaust emission control systems
 ISO 7983:1988 Woodworking machines – Single blade circular sawing machines with travelling table – Nomenclature and acceptance conditions
 ISO 7987:1985 Woodworking machines – Turning lathes – Nomenclature and acceptance conditions
 ISO 7988:1988 Woodworking machines – Double-end tenoning machines – Nomenclature and acceptance conditions
 ISO 7998:2005 Ophthalmic optics - Spectacle frames - Lists of equivalent terms and vocabulary

Notes

References

External links 
 International Organization for Standardization
 ISO Certification Provider
 ISO Consultant

International Organization for Standardization